Ossi Louhivaara (born August 31, 1983) is a Finnish former professional ice hockey player who most notably played with JYP Jyväskylä of the Liiga. Louhivaara was selected by the Ottawa Senators in the 8th round (260th overall) of the 2003 NHL Entry Draft.

Playing career
Louhivaara made his debut in Finland's top-flight Liiga playing with JYP Jyväskylä during the 2004–05 SM-liiga season. He captured the Finnish national championship with JYP in 2009 and 2012.

After having spent ten years with JYP, he moved abroad to join Lausanne HC of the Swiss National League A with whom he signed a two-year deal prior to the 2014–15 season.

When his contract with Lausanne was up in 2016, Louhivaara returned to Finland with original club, JYP.

Louhivaara played 15 seasons with JYP Jyväskylä, making a total of 729 Liiga appearances before ending his 19-year professional career following the 2020–21 season, announcing his retirement on 6 April 2021.

International play
After having represented Finnland's national team at the Euro Hockey Tour on several occasions, he made the roster for the 2015 World Championship in the Czech Republic.

Career statistics

Regular season and playoffs

International

References

External links

1983 births
Living people
Finnish ice hockey right wingers
JYP Jyväskylä players
KooKoo players
Lausanne HC players
Ottawa Senators draft picks
People from Kotka
SaPKo players
Sportspeople from Kymenlaakso